Branchiibius hedensis is a Gram-positive bacterium from the genus Branchiibius which has been isolated from the morid cod Physiculus japonicus from the Suruga Bay in Japan.

References

 

Micrococcales
Bacteria described in 2011